The 1896 Georgia Tech football team represented the Georgia Institute of Technology during the 1896 Southern Intercollegiate Athletic Association football season. It was the team's first season in the Southern Intercollegiate Athletic Association.

Schedule

References

Georgia Tech
Georgia Tech Yellow Jackets football seasons
Georgia Tech football